Lamproptera is a genus of butterflies in the family Papilionidae and the tribe Leptocircini.

Species

References

Papilionidae
Butterfly genera